Austin Rogers may refer to:

Austin Rogers (born 1995), American professional soccer goalkeeper
Austin Rogers (Jeopardy! contestant), New York City bartender and game show contestant
Buddy Austin (1929–1981), American professional wrestler